Z for Zachariah is a 2015 
apocalyptic science fiction film directed by Craig Zobel and starring Margot Robbie, Chiwetel Ejiofor, and Chris Pine. Written by Nissar Modi, it is based on the 1974 posthumously published book of the same name by Robert C. O'Brien, though the plot differs in some significant ways. The film's plot also resembles that of the 1959 Harry Belafonte movie The World, the Flesh and the Devil, which features a love triangle between a black engineer, white woman, and white man who may be the last people on Earth. The film was released on August 28, 2015, in the United States by Roadside Attractions. It received generally positive reviews from critics who mostly praised Robbie's performance. It grossed $121,461 at the box office.

Plot
Nuclear-apocalypse survivor Ann Burden lives an agrarian life on her family's valley farmstead, sheltered from radioactive contaminants by rocky hillsides, favorable weather patterns, and an abundant ground-fed water supply.  One day, Ann encounters refugee John Loomis. He claims to be an engineer, who, aided by medicines and a radiation suit, walked from a distant government bunker to Ann's valley.  Loomis bathes in contaminated water, and immediately sickens, but is nursed back to health by Ann, who welcomes him into her farmhouse.

Loomis regains his strength, and gradually, becomes part of Ann's humble rustic life.  He helps Ann pump diesel from local petroleum pumps and gets the farm's long-disused tractor running to expand her gardens for the winter.  Ann tells Loomis about her parents and younger brother who left the valley to find other survivors... but never returned.  Loomis speculates hydro-electricity might be generated from the nearby waterfall, using a water-wheel fashioned from the Burden church's planks and beams.  Ann is uncomfortable with this proposal, citing her father's involvement as preacher and her deeply-held Christian beliefs.  Loomis chooses to not pursue the project further.

Ann and Loomis grow closer, cultivating crops and preparing for long-term habitation.  Their domestic accord is marred by occasional tensions, notably involving matters of religion and Loomis' drinking.  The two come to the verge of initiating a sexual relationship, but Loomis demurs, claiming a sexual relationship will change them, and he needs more time.

Mysterious phenomena (including stolen food supplies and a half-glimpsed shadowy figure) culminate in the arrival of a third survivor, Caleb.  Although Ann welcomes Caleb into the farmhouse, Loomis resents Caleb, stating "whites belong with whites".  Loomis questions Caleb's backstory and motives;  Caleb repeatedly emphasizes the religious connection he shares with Ann (in stark contrast to Loomis).

The three survivors slowly settle into a marginally-stable partnership.  Both men relate post-apocalyptic horrors they witnessed before reaching the valley;  Loomis describes a radiation-sickened child begging him for death; later, he privately confides to Ann his belief the dying boy was her long-absent brother; Loomis confesses to the murder of the child.  Caleb pressures Ann to go forward with the water-wheel project, and work commences on tearing down her father's church for materials.  Perceiving their mutual attraction, Loomis awkwardly gives Ann consent to pursue a romantic relationship with Caleb, but belies his grief and anger in losing Ann through his remarks. Shortly thereafter, following a celebratory dinner, a heavily intoxicated Loomis tells Ann he loves her before passing out in a bedroom in Ann's home. After failing to wake Loomis, seeming to want his affection, Ann joins Caleb in the adjoining bathroom, where the two engage in sexual activity.

Further tensions arise between Caleb and Loomis following the sexual encounter.  The two men finish the water-wheel, moving it and its wooden flume into place atop the waterfall.  Encumbered by the bulky radiation suit, Caleb slips twice during his rope-assisted climb up the slick mossy cliff-side.  During the second slip, the two men silently lock eyes, both holding the rope, while Caleb teeters on the cliff's edge.

Loomis returns to the farmhouse alone.  Ann apologizes for her earlier indiscretion;  Loomis claims Caleb left in search of other settlements.  Ann takes this news badly, chasing after Caleb but not finding him, and lapses into a sullen silence.  The farmhouse's electric lights and refrigeration are restored.  Ann realizes Loomis moved her beloved church organ and three pews into the barn. Ann, playing a hymn, exchanges a distrustful glance at Loomis who is sitting and clasping his hands, as the scene fades to black.

Cast

 Chiwetel Ejiofor as John Loomis
 Margot Robbie as Ann Burden
 Chris Pine as Caleb

Production
The three principal cast members were announced in May 2013, which at the time included Amanda Seyfried. Seyfried, however, would eventually drop out and be replaced with Margot Robbie.

Set in the Eastern United States, the film was shot mostly in New Zealand. Principal photography began on January 27, 2014, in Canterbury, around the city of Christchurch. Director Craig Zobel and cinematographer Tim Orr drew on Russian director Andrei Tarkovsky's films, like Solaris (1972), The Mirror (1975), and Stalker (1979) for inspiration, incorporating landscapes into the story and for the use of desaturated color. The film was shot digitally on an Arri Alexa camera and Panavision anamorphic lenses. Additional scenes at the opening of the film were shot in Welch, West Virginia in March 2014.

Release
The film premiered at the Sundance Film Festival on January 24, 2015. Prior to the premiere of the film, Roadside Attractions acquired distribution rights to the film.

The film was released both theatrically and on demand in the United States on August 28, 2015, by Roadside Attractions.

Critical response
On Rotten Tomatoes the film has an approval rating of 79% based on reviews from 89 critics, with an average rating of 6.90/10. The site's consensus states: "Z for Zachariah wrings compelling drama out of its simplistic premise -- albeit at a pace that may test the patience of less contemplative viewers." 
On Metacritic it has a score of 68 out of 100, based on 28 reviews, indicating "generally favorable reviews".

Max Nicholson of IGN awarded 7.7 out of 10, saying "While the film isn't without a few tonal flaws, the performances -- particularly Robbie's -- keep the story grounded in a sublime, post-apocalyptic reality."  Matt Zoller Seitz of RogerEbert.com awarded it two and a half out of 4, saying "There are many sharply written, directed and performed moments of illumination and anxiety."

References

External links
 
 Z for Zachariah on SundanceTV

2015 films
2015 drama films
2015 thriller drama films
2015 science fiction films
2010s dystopian films
2010s English-language films
English-language Icelandic films
English-language Swiss films
Icelandic science fiction drama films
Icelandic thriller films
New Zealand post-apocalyptic films
New Zealand science fiction thriller films
New Zealand thriller drama films
Swiss science fiction thriller films
Swiss thriller drama films
Films based on American novels
Films based on science fiction novels
Films produced by Tobey Maguire
Films set on farms
Films set in the future
Films shot in New Zealand
Films shot in West Virginia
Roadside Attractions films